Johny Chand Singh (born 8 February 1993) is an Indian footballer who plays as a midfielder for Neroca FC in the I-League.

Career

Air India
Singh made his first-team debut for Air India FC in the I-League on 24 November 2012 against reigning champions Dempo S.C. coming on as a 92nd-minute substitute for Souvik Chakraborty in a match that Air India lost 1–0.

International
Singh has played for India at the under-19 level starting with the 2010 AFC U-19 qualifiers where he made his debut against Oman's under-19s on 10 November 2009 coming on as a 58th-minute substitute for Lalrindika Ralte. He then scored his first goal at the under-19 level almost two years later on 8 November 2011 against Pakistan during the 2012 AFC U-19 qualifiers in which he scored in the 53rd minute to give India's under-19s a consolation as they lost 2–1 to their biggest rivals.

Career statistics

Club
Statistics accurate as of 12 May 2013

References

Indian footballers
1993 births
Living people
I-League players
Air India FC players
India youth international footballers
Association football midfielders